Arran High School is a state-funded secondary school at Lamlash, on the Isle of Arran, Scotland. It is the only secondary school on the island, and is located beside Lamlash Primary School. The school has a roll of around 250 pupils, about 50 teachers, 16 prefects, 2 School Captains and 2 vice captains. At the beginning of 2008, a new school building was opened, replacing an older building which dated from the late 1930s.

The current Head Teacher is Mrs Susan Foster.

Depute Head Teachers is : Mrs Bunting and Mrs Wilks. Principal Teacher of Guidance is Jane Macbeth.

History
Before the school, pupils from the island would need to travel to and board at a school on the Isle of Bute.  The original Arran High School building was completed in 1939 but the building was taken over for use as a hospital in World War II. It only became a school in 1946 and was used as both a primary and secondary school.  At this time, the school was known as Lamlash Junior Secondary.

Head Teachers
Mr Petrie - 1947-1972 - Retired
Mr D Oakes - 1972-1994 - Retired
Mr I Murray - 1994-1998 - Left
Miss S Smith - 1998-2003 - Retired
Mr D Auld - 2003-2014 - Retired  
Mr B Smith - 2014–2020 - Left
Mrs S Foster - 2021- Current

New school
Former First Minister of Scotland Jack McConnell officially opened the new school building on 9 June 2008, although pupils were being educated in the new building since January 2008.

The school has 25 classrooms as well as a workshop, a theatre, a gym hall and dance studio, a fitness suite, a library, three support rooms and a cafeteria. The school also has a nursery for children aged 5 and younger, as well as three college rooms which Argyll College use. Within the school grounds there is a youth centre which was due to be demolished, but was resited to a new location within the school grounds instead.

References

External links 
 Arran High School web site
 Arran High School information from North Ayrshire Council
 Arran High School's page on Scottish Schools Online

Secondary schools in North Ayrshire
Isle of Arran
Educational institutions established in 1946
1946 establishments in Scotland